The  is a Japanese Go competition. It is open only to players of the Nihon Ki-in's Chubu branch located in Nagoya. The title match is a single game played between the reigning titleholder and a challenger. The winner's purse is 1,700,000 yen ($15,000).

Winners and runners-up

References

External links
 Nihon Ki-in archive 

Okan